A Massachusetts general election was held on November 6, 1956, in the Commonwealth of Massachusetts.

The election included:
 statewide elections for governor, lieutenant governor, attorney general, Secretary of the Commonwealth, treasurer, and auditor;
 district elections for U.S. Representatives, state representatives, state senators, and Governor's Councillors; and
 ballot questions at the state and local levels.

Democratic and Republican candidates were selected in party primaries held on September 18, 1956.

Governor 

Democrat Foster Furcolo was elected over Republican Sumner G. Whittier, Socialist Labor candidate Henning A. Blomen, and Prohibition candidate Mark R. Shaw.

Lieutenant Governor 
Incumbent Lt. Governor Sumner Whitter ran for Governor.

Democrat Robert F. Murphy was elected Lieutenant Governor over Republican Charles Gibbons, Socialist Labor candidate Francis A. Votano, and Prohibition candidate Harold E. Bassett.

Republican primary

Candidates 

 Charles Gibbons, former Speaker of the Massachusetts House of Representatives

Results 
Gibbons was unopposed for the Republican nomination.

Democratic primary

Candidates 

 James A. Burke, former State Representative from Milton and candidate for Lt. Governor in 1954
 Robert F. Murphy, former House Minority Leader and nominee for Governor in 1954
 George A. Wells, Executive Councilor

Results

General election

Results

Attorney General 
Republican Attorney General George Fingold was re-elected over Democrat Edward J. McCormack Jr., Socialist Workers candidate Fred M. Ingersol, and Prohibition candidate Howard Rand in the general election.

Democratic primary

Candidates 

 Edward J. McCormack Jr.
 Joseph D. Ward

General election

Candidates 

 George Fingold, incumbent Attorney General (Republican)
 Fred M. Ingersoll (Socialist Workers)
 Edward J. McCormack Jr. (Democratic)
 Howard Rand (Prohibition)

Results

Secretary of the Commonwealth 
Incumbent Secretary of the Commonwealth Edward J. Cronin defeated Republican Senate President Richard I. Furbush, Prohibition candidate Earl Dodge, and Socialist Labor candidate Lawrence Gilfedder in the general election.

Democratic primary

Candidates 

 Edward J. Cronin, incumbent Secretary of the Commonwealth
 Robert Emmet Dinsmore

Results

General election

Candidates 

 Edward J. Cronin, incumbent Secretary of the Commonwealth (Democratic)
 Earl Dodge, executive secretary of the Massachusetts Prohibition Party (Prohibition)
 Richard I. Furbush, President of the Massachusetts Senate (Republican)
 Lawrence Gilfedder (Socialist Workers)

Results

Treasurer and Receiver-General 
Incumbent Treasurer and Receiver-General John Francis Kennedy defeated Norwood Selectman Clement A. Riley, John F. Buckley, John M. Kennedy, and Henry Joseph Hurley in the Democratic primary and Republican Robert H. Beaudreau, Socialist Labor candidate Willy N. Hogseth, and Prohibition candidate Isaac Goddard in the general election.

Democratic primary

Candidates 

 John F. Buckley
 Henry Joseph Hurley
 John Francis Kennedy, incumbent Treasurer and Receiver-General
 John M. Kennedy
 Clement A. Riley, Norwood selectman and candidate for Treasurer in 1954

Results

General election

Candidates 

 Robert H. Beaudreau, U.S. Marshal for the District of Massachusetts (Republican)
 Isaac Goddard (Prohibition)
 Willy N. Hogseth (Socialist Workers)
 John Francis Kennedy, incumbent Treasurer and Receiver-General (Democratic)

Results

Auditor 
Incumbent Auditor Thomas J. Buckley defeated Republican Joseph A. Nobile, Socialist Labor candidate Anthony Martin, and Prohibition candidate John B. Lauder in the general election.

General election

References

 
Massachusetts